The 2009–10 Yeovil Town F.C. season was Yeovil Town's 7th season in the Football League and their fifth consecutive season in League One, finishing in 15th position with 53 points.

First team squad 
 Statistics include only League, FA Cup and League Cup appearances and goals, as of the end of the season.
 Age given is at the start of Yeovil's first match of the season (8 August 2009).

Transfers

In

Out

Loan in

Loan out

Match results

League One

League table

FA Cup

League Cup

Football League Trophy

Statistics

Player details 
Numbers in parentheses denote appearances as substitute.

See also 
 2009–10 in English football
 List of Yeovil Town F.C. seasons

References 

2009–10 Football League One by team
2009-10